EZ Streets is an American crime drama television series created by Paul Haggis. It premiered on CBS on October 27, 1996, with a two-hour pilot television film and ended on April 2, 1997. The series stars Ken Olin, Joe Pantoliano, and Jason Gedrick.

Synopsis
The series is set in a decaying American city located near the Canada–US border, and deals with the interconnected lives of the city's criminals, politicians, and police officers. The primary characters were three different men from various backgrounds trying to survive in the nameless bombed-out inner city. 

Cameron Quinn was a police detective who had just joined the intelligence division to clear his name after being categorized as a "dirty cop" after his partner was killed in a drug sting gone wrong. Quinn then worked undercover for Captain Geary by infiltrating the local criminal underworld. Quinn's prime target (and the thug who murdered his partner) was Jimmy Murtha, an extremely violent hoodlum who was determined to rise in the ranks of the local Mob. Murtha was often helped by his sexy, but unscrupulous attorney, Theresa Connors. She was adept at using every legal loophole and ploy to keep Murtha out of jail. Murtha's primary competition was the mobster who ran the businesses in the other half of the city, Michael "Fivers" Dugan. 

It appeared that everyone in the city counsel, even the proud mayor Christian Davidson, were under the thumb of Fivers Dugan. Mayor Davidson was doing business with Dugan to try to re-build the decaying and crime-ridden community for political contributions. Murtha, despite his ruthless nature and frequent evil dealings, had one positive goal: to save his neighborhood from being overrun with drugs, crime and local teen gangs.

Danny Rooney was a mutual childhood friend of Murtha who had just gotten released from prison after serving three years for taking the rap in an armed robbery that one of Murtha's thugs committed. Despite his desire to go straight, Rooney was forced to go to work for Murtha in performing various illegal jobs. Rooney hoped that the dirty money he earned would help him get back together with his estranged, drug-addicted wife Elli, and their young daughter Janie.

Characters 
 Ken Olin as Detective Cameron Quinn
 Joe Pantoliano as Jimmy Murtha
 Jason Gedrick as Danny Rooney
 R. D. Call as Michael "Fivers" Dugan
 John Finn as Captain Geary
 Debrah Farentino as Theresa Conners
 Richard Portnow as Detective Frank Collero
 Carl Lumbly as Mayor Christian Davidson
 Sarah Trigger as Elli Rooney - Danny's estranged wife
 Andrew Divoff as Andre "Frenchie" Desormeaux
 Mike Starr as Mickey Kinnear
 Robert Spillane as Bobby
 Rosemary Murphy as Christina Quinn - Cameron's mother
 Saverio Guerra as Sammy Feathers
 Courtney Jacquin as Janie Rooney - Danny and Elli's daughter
 Andrew Rothenberg as Shirt
 John St. Ryan as Bo
 Gregg Henry as Councilman Eeling (1997)
 Jack McGee as Leo (1997)
 Louis Lombardi as The Fat Man (1997)

Reception and cancellation
After its first episode in its regular timeslot on Wednesday, October 30, 1996, it was put on hiatus with CBS president Leslie Moonves promising that the show would be "relaunched" at a later date.
The series was relaunched that spring from March 1, 1997, to April 2, 1997, but failed to garner a substantial audience. CBS canceled EZ Streets in April 1997 due to low ratings. The last episode, "Neither Have I Wings to Fly", never aired on CBS, although it was broadcast once in Canada. Critics criticized Moonves for not reairing the pilot and first series episode before the relaunch.

Episodes

Syndication
In 2006, repeats of the series began airing on the new U.S. cable channel, Sleuth. All episodes, including the one not shown on CBS, were aired.

Home media
On May 23, 2006, Universal Studios released the 2-hour pilot episode and the episodes "Every Dog Has Its Day" and "One Acquainted with the Night" on a single DVD as part of its Brilliant But Cancelled series.

Awards and nominations

References

External links 
 
 The Wild The Not So Innocence and the EZ Streets: Why Did CBS Cancel the Year's Best Show? on Salon.com

1996 American television series debuts
1997 American television series endings
1990s American crime drama television series
Television series created by Paul Haggis
CBS original programming
English-language television shows
Television series by Universal Television
Television shows set in Pennsylvania